The 1975 Houston Astros season was a season in American baseball. The team finished last in the National League West with a record of 64–97, 43 games behind the Cincinnati Reds. The Astros' .398 winning percentage is, as of 2021, the fourth worst in franchise history. In three consecutive seasons, in 2011, 2012 and 2013 the Astros finished each season with lower winning percentages. Houston also lost 97 games in 1965 and 1991, but lost more than 100 games each in the 2011-2013 seasons. This was the first season the Astros donned their now famous rainbow uniforms. The uniforms would make slight alterations throughout the years. In 1975, the numbers on the back of the jersey were inside a white circle but by the following season, the white circle was eliminated entirely. In 1987, the rainbows were relegated to the shoulders of both home and away uniforms (prior to that they were only used on the away uniforms shoulders) and by 1994, the rainbow uniforms were retired after 19 years for a more contemporary look.

Offseason 
 December 3, 1974: Lee May and Jay Schlueter were traded by the Astros to the Baltimore Orioles for Enos Cabell and Rob Andrews.
 January 5, 1975: Pitcher Don Wilson died of carbon monoxide poisoning.

Regular season

Opening Day starters 
Rob Andrews
Enos Cabell
César Cedeño
José Cruz
Larry Dierker
Cliff Johnson
Milt May
Roger Metzger
Doug Rader

Season standings

Record vs. opponents

Notable transactions 
 June 3, 1975: Kim Seaman was drafted by the Astros in the 23rd round of the 1975 Major League Baseball draft, but did not sign.

Roster

Player stats

Batting

Starters by position 
Note: Pos = Position; G = Games played; AB = At bats; H = Hits; Avg. = Batting average; HR = Home runs; RBI = Runs batted in

Other batters 
Note: G = Games played; AB = At bats; H = Hits; Avg. = Batting average; HR = Home runs; RBI = Runs batted in

Pitching

Starting pitchers 
Note: G = Games pitched; IP = Innings pitched; W = Wins; L = Losses; ERA = Earned run average; SO = Strikeouts

Other pitchers 
Note: G = Games pitched; IP = Innings pitched; W = Wins; L = Losses; ERA = Earned run average; SO = Strikeouts

Relief pitchers 
Note: G = Games pitched; W = Wins; L = Losses; SV = Saves; ERA = Earned run average; SO = Strikeouts

Farm system

References

External links
1975 Houston Astros season at Baseball Reference

Houston Astros seasons
Houston Astros season
Houston Astro